Amphipoda is an order of malacostracan crustaceans with no carapace and generally with laterally compressed bodies. There are more than 9,900 amphipod species so far described. They are mostly marine animals, but are found in almost all aquatic environments. Some 1,900 species live in fresh water, and the order also includes the terrestrial sandhoppers such as Talitrus saltator.

Etymology and names
The name Amphipoda comes, via New Latin , from the Greek roots  'on both/all sides' and  'foot'. This contrasts with the related Isopoda, which have a single kind of thoracic leg. Particularly among anglers, amphipods are known as freshwater shrimp, scuds, or sideswimmers.

Description

Anatomy

The body of an amphipod is divided into 13 segments, which can be grouped into a head, a thorax and an abdomen.

The head is fused to the thorax, and bears two pairs of antennae and one pair of sessile compound eyes. It also carries the mouthparts, but these are mostly concealed.

The thorax and abdomen are usually quite distinct and bear different kinds of legs; they are typically laterally compressed, and there is no carapace. The thorax bears eight pairs of uniramous appendages, the first of which are used as accessory mouthparts; the next four pairs are directed forwards, and the last three pairs are directed backwards. Gills are present on the thoracic segments, and there is an open circulatory system with a heart, using haemocyanin to carry oxygen in the haemolymph to the tissues. The uptake and excretion of salts is controlled by special glands on the antennae.

The abdomen is divided into two parts: the pleosome which bears swimming legs; and the urosome, which comprises a telson and three pairs of uropods which do not form a tail fan as they do in animals such as true shrimp.

Size

A study of the Kermadec Trench observed more specimens of A. gigantea, the largest of which was estimated at 34.9 cm long, and collected some for examination, the largest of which was measured at 27.8 cm long.

Some amphipods exhibit sexual dimorphism. In dimorphic species, males are usually larger than females, although this is reversed in the genus Crangonyx.

Reproduction and life cycle
Amphipods engage in amplexus, a precopulatory guarding behavior in which males will grasp a female with their gnathopods (enlarged appendages used for feeding) and carry the female held against their ventral surface. Amplexus can last from two to over fifteen days, depending on water temperature, and ends when the female molts, at which point her eggs are ready for fertilisation.  

Mature females bear a marsupium, or brood pouch, which holds her eggs while they are fertilised, and until the young are ready to hatch. As a female ages, she produces more eggs in each brood. Mortality is around 25–50% for the eggs. There are no larval stages; the eggs hatch directly into a juvenile form, and sexual maturity is generally reached after 6 moults. Some species have been known to eat their own exuviae after moulting

Diversity and classification

Over 10,500 species of amphipods are currently recognised. Traditionally they were placed in the four suborders Gammaridea, Caprellidea, Hyperiidea, and Ingolfiellidea. 
Suborder Gammaridea contained the majority of taxa, including all the freshwater and terrestrial species.  In contrast, the small suborder Ingolfiellidea only had 40 species.

Gammaridea had been recognised as a problematic group in need of taxonomic revision. It had no synapomorphies and became the repository for family-level taxa that didn't have synapomorphies for one of the other suborders. A new classification that breaks up and replaces Gammaridea has been developed in the work of J. K. Lowry and A. A. Myers using cladistic analysis of morphological characters. In 2003, suborder Corophiidea was reestablished for parts of Gammaridea and for the Caprellidea, which was found to be a derived part of the corophiidean clade and became infraorder Caprellida. Then in 2013, new large suborder Senticaudata was split off from the Gammaridea. The Senticaudata, which comprised over half of the known amphipod species., was divided into six infraorders, one of which was the former Corophiidea (including the former Caprellidea as a parvorder). The dismemberment of Gammaridea was completed in 2017 with the establishment of four new suborders in a six suborder classification: Pseudingolfiellidea,
Hyperiidea, Colomastigidea, Hyperiopsidea, Senticaudata and Amphilochidea. At the same time, Ingolfiellidea was split from Amphipoda and reclassified as order Ingolfiellida. The more recent work  of Copilaş-Ciocianu et al. (2020) using analysis of molecular data (including 18S and 28S rRNA sequences and the protein coding COI and H3 sequences) found general support for three major groups corresponding to suborders Amphilochidea, Hyperiidea and Senticaudata, but suggests some groups need to move between Amphilochidea and Senticaudata in a taxonomic revision. 

The classification listed immediately below, from the rank of suborder down to superfamily, represents the traditional division as given in Martin & Davis (2001), except that superfamilies are recognised here within the Gammaridea. The new classification of Lowry and Meyers (2017) is shown in the cladogram.

Fossil record
Amphipods are thought to have originated in the Lower Carboniferous. Despite the group's age, however, the fossil record of the order Amphipoda is meagre, comprising specimens of one species from the Lower Cretaceous (Hauterivian) Weald Clay (United Kingdom) and 12 species dating back only as far as the Upper Eocene, where they have been found in Baltic amber.

Ecology

Amphipods are found in almost all aquatic environments, from fresh water to water with twice the salinity of sea water and even in the Challenger Deep, the deepest known point in the ocean. They are almost always an important component of aquatic ecosystems, often acting as mesograzers. Most species in the suborder Gammaridea are epibenthic, although they are often collected in plankton samples. Members of the Hyperiidea are all planktonic and marine. Many are symbionts of gelatinous animals, including salps, medusae, siphonophores, colonial radiolarians and ctenophores, and most hyperiids are associated with gelatinous animals during some part of their life cycle. Some 1,900 species, or 20% of the total amphipod diversity, live in fresh water or other non-marine waters. Notably rich endemic amphipod faunas are found in the ancient Lake Baikal and waters of the Caspian Sea basin.

The landhoppers of the family Talitridae (which also includes semi-terrestrial and marine animals) are terrestrial, living in damp environments such as leaf litter. Landhoppers have a wide distribution in areas that were formerly part of Gondwana, but have colonised parts of Europe and North America in recent times.

Around 750 species in 160 genera and 30 families are troglobitic, and are found in almost all suitable habitats, but with their centres of diversity in the Mediterranean Basin, southeastern North America and the Caribbean.

In populations found in Benthic ecosystems, amphipods play an essential role in controlling brown algae growth. The mesograzer behaviour of amphipods greatly contributes to the suppression of brown algal dominance in the absence of amphipod predators. Amphipods display a strong preference for brown algae in Benthic ecosystems, but due to removal of mesograzers by predators such as fish, brown algae is able to dominate these communities over green and red algae species.

Morphology
Compared to other crustacean groups, such as the Isopoda, Rhizocephala or Copepoda, relatively few amphipods are parasitic on other animals. The most notable example of parasitic amphipods are the whale lice (family Cyamidae). Unlike other amphipods, these are dorso-ventrally flattened, and have large, strong claws, with which they attach themselves to baleen whales. They are the only parasitic crustaceans which cannot swim during any part of their life cycle.

Foraging behaviour
Most amphipods are detritivores or scavengers, with some being grazers of algae, omnivores or predators of small insects and crustaceans. Food is grasped with the front two pairs of legs, which are armed with large claws. More immobile species of amphipods eat higher quantities of less nutritious food rather than actively seeking more nutritious food. This is a type of compensatory feeding. This behaviour may have evolved to minimise predation risk when searching for other foods. Ampithoe longimana, for example, is more sedentary than other species and have been observed to remain on host plants longer. In fact, when presented with both high- and low-nutrition food options, the sedentary species Ampithoe longimana does not distinguish between the two options. Other amphipod species, such as Gammarus mucronatus and Elasmopus levis, which have superior predator avoidance and are more mobile, are better able to pursue different food sources. In species without the compensatory feeding ability, survivorship, fertility, and growth can be strongly negatively affected in the absence of high-quality food. Compensatory feeding may also explain the year-round presence of A. longimana in certain waters. Because algal presence changes throughout the year in certain communities, the evolution of flexible feeding techniques such as compensatory feeding may have been beneficial to survival.

Ampithoe longimana has been observed to avoid certain compounds when foraging for food. In response to this avoidance, species of seaweed such as Dictyopteris membranacea or Dictyopteris hoytii have evolved to produce C11 sulfur compounds and C-9 oxo-acids in their bodies as defense mechanisms that specifically deter amphipods instead of deterrence to consumption by other predators.

The incidence of cannibalism and intraguild predation is relatively high in some species, although adults may decrease cannibalistic behaviour directed at juveniles when they are likely to encounter their own offspring. In addition to age, the sex seems to affect cannibalistic behaviour as males cannibalised newly moulted females less than males.

They have, rarely, been identified as feeding on humans; in Melbourne in 2017 a boy who stood in the sea for about half an hour had severe bleeding from wounds on his legs that did not coagulate easily. This was found to have been caused by "sea fleas" identified as lysianassid amphipods, possibly in a feeding group. Their bites are not venomous and do not cause lasting damage.

See also 

Pseudamphithoides incurvaria
Orchestia grillus

References

External links
 
 

 
Malacostraca
Taxa named by Pierre André Latreille
Crustacean orders
Extant Hauterivian first appearances